Scraps  may refer to:

Arts and entertainment
 Scraps (album), a 1972 album by the rock band NRBQ
 Scraps the Patchwork Girl, a character in the Oz books
 Grady Scraps, a character in several Spider-Man storylines
 Scraps (American magazine) (1828–1849), an annual satirical publication

Other uses
 Scraps (batter), leftover fried batter that is sometimes eaten in the North of England
 Johannes Scraps Wessels (1871–1929), South African international rugby union player

See also
Scrap